List of airports in Saint Kitts and Nevis, sorted by location.



List

See also 

 Transport in Saint Kitts and Nevis
 List of airports by ICAO code: T#TK - Saint Kitts and Nevis
 Wikipedia: WikiProject Aviation/Airline destination lists: North America#Saint Kitts and Nevis

External links 
Lists of airports in Saint Kitts and Nevis:
Great Circle Mapper
Aircraft Charter World
The Airport Guide
World Aero Data

 
Saint Kitts and Nevis
Saint Kitts and Nevis
Airports